Henry Paolucci (1921/1922–1999) was an American professor of classical politics and literature, and a Conservative politician.

References 

1920s births
1999 deaths
Year of birth uncertain
Academics from New York (state)
New York (state) politicians
Literary scholars